Samba Touré (born June 15, 1968) is a Malian singer and guitarist.

References

Living people
1968 births
Malian blues guitarists
People from Tombouctou Region
21st-century Malian people
Place of birth missing (living people)